Lockington railway station was a minor station serving the village of Lockington, East Riding of Yorkshire, England. It was on the Hull to Scarborough Line  and was opened on 6 October 1846 by the York and North Midland Railway. It closed on 13 June 1960.

In 1986, the Lockington rail crash, a serious collision on the level crossing by the station causing  eight deaths and several injuries.

The station building, which was designed by George Townsend Andrews, was given Grade II listed building status in 1987.

See also
 Lockington rail crash

References

Sources

External links

Disused railway stations in the East Riding of Yorkshire
Grade II listed buildings in the East Riding of Yorkshire
Railway stations in Great Britain opened in 1846
Railway stations in Great Britain closed in 1960
Stations on the Hull to Scarborough line
1846 establishments in England
Former York and North Midland Railway stations
George Townsend Andrews railway stations
Grade II listed railway stations